Biwi Ho To Aisi is a 1988 Bollywood film, directed and written by J. K. Bihari and starring Rekha, Farooq Sheikh and Bindu . The music was scored by the duo of Laxmikant–Pyarelal. The film marked the on-screen debut of Salman Khan and Renu Arya.

Summary

The story is a family drama that revolves around the lead pair, played by Rekha and Farooq Shaikh, who play a married couple. It's about how the character Shalu overcomes all obstacles in her married life to win over the acceptance of her domineering mother-in-law Kamla (Bindu).

Plot

Bhandaris are an affluent upper-class family. The household is fiercely dominated by Kamla (Bindu) who is the matriarch of the Bhandari family. She takes care of the family business while her stay-at-home husband Kailash (Kader Khan) is a gharjamai. Kamla wants her eldest son Suraj (Farooq Shaikh) to marry a girl whose social status matches theirs.

However, contrary to her wishes, Suraj follows his heart and marries the not so rich, yet talented village belle Shalu (Rekha), which infuriates Kamla to no end. Together with her comical, but scheming secretary (Asrani), Kamla vows to throw her out of the house with their shrewd and cunning tactics deployed against her.

Meanwhile, Shalu tries to be a dutiful daughter-in-law by trying to win the heart of Kamla. She has the full support and understanding of her father-in-law, Kailash, who treats her like a daughter, and of her young brother-in-law Vikram a.k.a. Vicky (Salman Khan), who sometimes cannot bear the atrocities meted out to his sister-in-law and gets vocal in protests against his tyrannical mother.

After endless attempts at humiliation and personal attacks, Shalu finally hits back in her style and her true identity is revealed towards the climax. She shocks everyone with her diction and articulate speech in sharp contrast to her crude village belle identity.

Her father Ashok Mehra (a family friend of the Bhandaris) reveals her true identity. Kamla learns that Shalu is the Oxford-educated daughter of Mehra, who, in connivance with her father-in-law Kailash, had won her way into the family, in order to teach her a lesson in humility and humanity. Kailash gets vocal against Kamla for the first time.

Kamla realises her error and repents for her behaviour towards the family when they all decide to leave her and the house. Kamla sincerely apologises to all and happiness finally enters the Bhandari household.

Cast
 Farooq Shaikh as Suraj Kailash Bhandari
 Rekha as Shalu Ashok Mehra / Shalu Suraj Kailash Bhandari 
 Salman Khan as Vikram Kailash Bhandari (Vicky), Suraj's brother
 Bindu as Kamla Kailash Bhandari
 Kader Khan as Kailash Bhandari
 Asrani as Secretary P. K. Patialewala
 Om Shivpuri as Ashok Mehra (Shalu's Father)
 Renu Arya as Vikram's love interest

Soundtrack
The soundtrack is available on T-Series.

References

External links

1980s Hindi-language films
1988 films
Films scored by Laxmikant–Pyarelal